The Marie Selby Botanical Gardens is a  botanical garden located at 900 South Palm Avenue in Sarasota, Florida. The Gardens are located on the grounds of the former home of Marie and William Selby.

Flora
The Gardens feature preserved collections of epiphytes, feature more than 20,000 living plants including 5,500 orchids, 3,500 bromeliads and 1,600 other plants. The living collection is accompanied by an herbarium, with dried and preserved specimens of tropical flora; the world's second-largest spirit collection consisting of vials of mostly orchid flowers in preservative fluids; and a library. More than 150 expeditions to the tropics and subtropics have contributed to these collections. Selby Gardens' botanists have discovered or described more than 2,000 plant species previously unknown to science.

The Gardens maintain banyans, bamboo, live oaks, palms, mangroves, succulents, wildflowers, cycads, bromeliads, a butterfly garden, a fragrance garden, an edible garden, and a koi pond, on a site bordering Sarasota Bay. The interactive Ann Goldstein Children's Rainforest Garden is designed to help children develop a lifelong appreciation for rainforest plants.

Divisions
Major divisions of the Gardens are as follows:

 The Mulford B. Foster Bromeliad Identification Center was established in 1979 in honor of Mulford Foster, one of the leading bromeliad collectors to provide information on the horticultural and botanical aspects of the Bromeliaceae. It maintains taxonomic files for over 2800 species, genera, and subfamilies, and houses more than 2,000 photographic slides for use by individuals, institutions and societies.  It is supported by local and international bromeliad societies.
 Greenhouses contain over 10,500 accessions in more than 600 genera representing 92 plant families, including 4900 orchids, 3600 bromeliads, 660 aroids, 240 ferns, 140 gesneriads, and 1,300 other plants.
 Gardens contain approximately 2,300 recorded tropical and subtropical plantings, representing some 1,200 species, 620 genera, and 165 plant families. A significant portion are well-documented, vouchered species collected from native habitats.
 The Herbarium contains approximately 106,000 specimens of tropical flora, largely neotropical, with an emphasis on epiphytes. Ecuador flora and flora of the Andes are well represented. Current collections of families, with number of types for each, is: Orchidaceae (1,200), Bromeliaceae (109), Gesneriaceae (105), Araceae (62), Marantaceae (16),  Heliconiaceae (14), and miscellany (61).
 The Orchid Identification Center was established in 1975 to study and curate wild-collected and conservatory grown orchids, and to serve as a center for their identification. It has amassed a collection of more than 20,000 taxonomic reference files, a collection of photographs, and 24,000 spirit preserved specimens, with particular strengths in collections from Mexico, Central America, Andean South America, and Venezuela.
 The Christy Payne House houses the Museum of Botany and the Arts, the Garden's gallery for changing exhibits of botanical art and photography. It is listed on the US National Register of Historic Places, to which it was added on September 25, 1998.
 The Research Library houses approximately 124,000 volumes, dealing primarily with tropical plants, and especially epiphytes. It includes a rare book collection dating to the late 18th century, 14,000 issues of scientific journals, 2,500 microfiche of early botanical references and herbaria, a photographic slide collection, and other related holdings.
 The Spirit Collection contains nearly 28,000 vials of flowers in preservative fluids, making it the second-largest such collection in the world after the Royal Botanic Gardens, Kew. The collection includes 24,000 vials of the orchid family (Orchidaceae); several thousand vials of gesneriads (Gesneriaceae); and 300 vials of bromeliads (Bromeliaceae).

Selby Gardens Research Library 
The Selby Gardens Research Library began with a request made from William Cole's estate in 1973. Building the research library was part of the requirement when planning and building the Selby Botanical Gardens and began acquiring the book collection even before the Botanical Gardens opened to the public. It is considered to be one of the finest, most respected botanical libraries in the United States, with many scientists from all over the world coming to visit the numerous collections. Since the library opened in 1975, many people have contributed to the growing collection of botanical research, including collections from L.O. Williams, Dr. Helen Miller, and Dr. Bruce McAlpin. The library is primarily a research tool and reference for scientists and horticulturalists, along with amateur plant enthusiasts. A searchable catalogue of the collection is available online for viewing.

Library collections 
 Main library collection - holds 7,000 volumes with 4,900 titles. This collection consists of ecology, systematic botany, a taxonomy of epiphytic plant families, and ethnobotany, among other subjects.
 Rare Books - the collection contains over 500 volumes, with some volumes being over 200 years old. This collection includes the Curtis’ Botanical Magazine from 1788. However access to this collection is only available through an appointment and accompaniment with a librarian.
 Serials - over 310 titles on horticultural and botanical journals, along with newsletters.
 Botanical Prints - part of the Rare Books but separate. Access is extremely limited, normally not open to the general public.
 Blueprints, Slides, CDs are also available to view in the main library collection
 Microfiche collection - over 141 titles including the hard-to-find Orchidaceae. 

The library is only open on Monday (9 am to 12 pm) and on Friday (1 pm to 4 pm). It is open to the general public but an appointment must be made ahead of time to view and use the collection. Also, no materials can be checked out to the general public. For members and volunteers, they can visit the library during library hours and check out books and journal collections for a two-week period.

Selby Botanical Gardens Press 
The Selby Botanical Gardens Press publishes the research journal Selbyana  – The Journal of The Marie Selby Botanical Gardens, botanical books, proceedings, field guides, and posters. Selbyana, published since 1975, is a peer-reviewed scientific journal issued twice a year, focusing on research on canopy biology and tropical plants, especially epiphytes. This includes many papers on gesneriads, including valuable contributions by Hans Wiehler and Larry Skog, bromeliads and orchids.

Barancik Foundation Grant 
In 2018 the Charles & Margery Barancik Foundation in Sarasota, Florida, announced that it had awarded a $2 million grant to the Marie Selby Botanical Gardens, in support of its greening-focused master plan and sustainability going forward.

Gallery

See also 
 List of botanical gardens in the United States

References

External links

 Marie Selby Botanical Gardens website
 Sarasota County listings at National Register of Historic Places
 Christy Payne Mansion at Florida's Office of Cultural and Historical Programs

Botanical gardens in Florida
National Register of Historic Places in Sarasota County, Florida
Sarasota, Florida
Texaco
Parks in Sarasota County, Florida